Henry Cargill (August 13, 1838 – October 1, 1903) was an Ontario farmer, merchant and political figure. He represented Bruce East in the House of Commons of Canada from 1887 to 1891 and from 1892 to 1903 as a Conservative member.

He was born in Nassagaweya Township, Upper Canada, the son of David Carill, an Irish immigrant. Cargill studied at Queen's College and entered his father's lumber business in Halton County, moving to Bruce County in 1879 after purchasing a large parcel of land known as the Greenock Swamp which contained large stands of white pine. In 1864, he had married Margaret Davidson. Cargill established mills to process the timber, also establishing a woollen mill and a general store. He also raised cattle, horses and sheep. The village of Cargill developed as the result of his efforts in the area. He served as reeve for Greenock Township from 1884 to 1886 and also served as village postmaster. He was defeated in 1891 but appealed and won the subsequent by-election in 1892. Cargill died in the House of Commons in Ottawa in 1903.

His daughter Margaret married William Humphrey Bennett, who later served in the federal parliament. His son Wellington David carried on his father's business and went on to serve in the provincial assembly.

External links 

The History of the County of Bruce and of the minor municipalities therein ..., N Robertson (1906)
Biography at the Dictionary of Canadian Biography Online

1838 births
1903 deaths
Conservative Party of Canada (1867–1942) MPs
Members of the House of Commons of Canada from Ontario